Novo Cinemas is a movie theatre chain owned by Elan Group Qatar operating in the United Arab Emirates (U.A.E.), Qatar and Bahrain. It is headquartered in Doha and considered one of the larger cinema chains in the Middle East. 

It was previously known as Grand Cinemas since 2000 until it relaunched on May 6, 2014 under the Novo Cinemas name, with theatres located in Qatar, Bahrain, Dubai, Abu Dhabi, Sharjah and Ras al-Khaimah.

Debbie Stanford-Kristiansen, CEO of Novo Cinemas, has been crowned ‘Female CEO of the Year’ at a prestigious industry award for her outstanding contribution to the regional film industry.

Despite the 2014 rebrand, the Grand Cinemas brand itself continues to exist as a separate corporate entity based in Lebanon, owned by Selim Ramia & Co., one of the co-founders and former executives of Gulf Film LLC.

History 
The Grand Cinemas brand name was launched in Dubai, United Arab Emirates, in 2000. 

In July 2005, Grand Cinemas launched the first IMAX in the Middle East at Ibn Battuta Mall Megaplex in Dubai.

In July 2007, the Grand Cinemas franchise expands into Lebanon under the ownership of local businessman Selim Ramia, one of the co-founders of the Gulf Film LLC Group. The company continues presently as an independent entity despite the 2014 rebrand in the U.A.E.

It was relaunched on May 6, 2014 as Novo Cinemas.

Services 
 Online booking
 Mobile booking

Private Bookings 
 Private screenings
 Birthday parties
 Special events
 Team building

Branches

United Arab Emirates

Dubai 
 Ibn Battuta Mall (IMAX)
 IMG Worlds of Adventure (IMAX)
 Dubai Festival City (IMAX & MX4D)
 Dragon Mart 2

Abu Dhabi 
 The Mall at The World Trade Center
 Bawabat Al Sharq Mall, Baniyas

Ras Al Khaimah   
 Manar Mall

Sharjah  
 Buhairah Centre
 Mega Mall
 Sahara Centre

Qatar 
 The Pearl (IMAX)
01 Mall
Mall of Qatar (IMAX)
Souq Waqif
Tawar Mall
North gate

Bahrain 
 Seef Mall, Muharraq (IMAX)

OMAN 
 Mall of Muscat - Muscat

See also 
The Movie Masters Cinema Group, Grand Cinemas is also a cinema chain, operating under parent company Movie Masters, in Western Australia. Movie Masters also operates Ace Cinemas.

References 

 http://gulfnews.com/business/sectors/media/for-novo-it-is-going-to-be-more-than-just-cinema-1.1335511
 http://www.tradearabia.com/news/MEDIA_287534.html

External links 
 
 Showtimes
 Gulf Film
 Qatar Media Services (q.media)

Cinemas and movie theaters chains
Cinema chains in the United Arab Emirates
Cinema chains in Qatar
Cinema chains in Bahrain
Companies based in Dubai
Emirati brands